|}

The Irish 2,000 Guineas is a Group 1 flat horse race in Ireland open to three-year-old thoroughbred colts and fillies. It is run at the Curragh over a distance of 1 mile (1,609 metres), and it is scheduled to take place each year in May.

History
The event was established in 1921, a year before the launch of the Irish 1,000 Guineas. The inaugural running was won by Soldennis.

It is Ireland's equivalent of the 2,000 Guineas, and in recent years it has taken place three weeks after that race. The field usually includes horses which previously contested the English version, and nine have achieved victory in both events. The first was Right Tack in 1969, and the most recent was Churchill in 2017.

The leading horses from the Irish 2,000 Guineas often go on to compete in the following month's St. James's Palace Stakes. The most recent to win both races was Gleneagles in 2015.

Records
Leading jockey (5 wins):
 Tommy Burns, Sr. – Soldennis (1921), Soldumeno (1923), Cornfield (1939), Grand Weather (1947), Beau Sabreur (1948)
 Martin Quirke – Salisbury (1929), Glannarg (1930), Museum (1935), Nearchus (1938), Khosro (1941)

Leading trainer (11 wins):
 Aidan O'Brien – Desert King (1997), Saffron Walden (1999), Black Minnaloushe (2001), Rock of Gibraltar (2002), Henrythenavigator (2008), Mastercraftsman (2009), Roderic O'Connor (2011), Power (2012), Magician (2013), Gleneagles (2015), Churchill (2017)

Leading owner since 1950 (10 wins): (includes part ownership)
 Sue Magnier – Saffron Walden (1999), Black Minnaloushe (2001), Rock of Gibraltar (2002), Henrythenavigator (2008), Mastercraftsman (2009), Roderic O'Connor (2011), Power (2012), Magician (2013), Gleneagles (2015), Churchill (2017)

Winners since 1962

Earlier winners

 1921: Soldennis
 1922: Spike Island
 1923: Soldumeno
 1924: Grand Joy
 1925: St Donagh
 1926: Embargo
 1927: Fourth Hand
 1928: Baytown
 1929: Salisbury
 1930: Glannarg
 1931: Double Arch
 1932: Lindley
 1933: Canteener
 1934: Cariff
 1935: Museum
 1936: Hocus Pocus
 1937: Phideas
 1938: Nearchus
 1939: Cornfield
 1940: Teasel
 1941: Khosro
 1942: Windsor Slipper
 1943: The Phoenix
 1944: Good Morning / Slide On  
 1945: Stalino
 1946: Claro
 1947: Grand Weather
 1948: Beau Sabreur
 1949: Solonaway
 1950: Mighty Ocean
 1951: Signal Box
 1952: D C M
 1953: Sea Charger
 1954: Arctic Wind
 1955: Hugh Lupus
 1956: Lucero
 1957: Jack Ketch
 1958: Hard Ridden
 1959: El Toro
 1960: Kythnos
 1961: Light Year
 1962: Arctic Storm
 1963: Linacre
 1964: Santa Claus

See also
 Horse racing in Ireland
 Irish Triple Crown race winners
 List of Irish flat horse races

References
 Paris-Turf:
 Racing Post:

 galopp-sieger.de – Irish 2000 Guineas.
 ifhaonline.org – International Federation of Horseracing Authorities – Irish 2000 Guineas (2019).
 irishracinggreats.com – Irish 2,000 Guineas (Group 1).
 pedigreequery.com – Irish 2000 Guineas Stakes – Curragh.
 tbheritage.com – Irish Two Thousand Guineas.

Flat races in Ireland
Curragh Racecourse
Flat horse races for three-year-olds
Recurring sporting events established in 1921
1921 establishments in Ireland